Chi Andromedae ( Andromedae,  And) is the Bayer designation for a star in the northern constellation of Andromeda. It has an apparent visual magnitude of +5.01, which is relatively faint for a naked-eye star.

This is most likely a spectroscopic binary system with an estimated orbital period of 20.8 years and an eccentricity of 0.37. The primary component has a stellar classification of G8 III, which indicates it is a giant star that has exhausted the supply of hydrogen at its core and evolved away from the main sequence. The outer envelope has expanded to about nine times the radius of the Sun and it is radiating 47 times the luminosity of the Sun at an effective temperature of 5,070 K. This heat gives the star the yellow-hued glow of a G-type star. It appears to be rotating very slowly with no measurable projected rotational velocity. The secondary component seems to be a main-sequence star of the spectral class G or K.

References

External links 
 Simbad
 Image Chi Andromedae

Andromedae, Chi
Andromedae, 52
010072
Andromeda (constellation)
G-type giants
007719
0469
BD+43 0343
Spectroscopic binaries